Dalachów  is a village in the administrative district of Gmina Rudniki, within Olesno County, Opole Voivodeship, in south-western Poland.

In 2004 the village had a population of 1,295.

Gallery

References

Villages in Olesno County